The Prisoner of Corbal is a 1936 British historical drama film directed by Karl Grune and starring Nils Asther, Hugh Sinclair and Hazel Terry. It is also known by the alternative title The Marriage of Corbal. It is set against the backdrop of the French Revolution.

The film was made at British and Dominions Elstree Studios as an independent production which was released by General Film Distributors. The film is based on the 1927 novel The Nuptials of Corbal by Rafael Sabatini.

Plot
The aristocrat Cleonie is the object of affection for both the Marquis of Corbal and Citizen-Deputy of the revolution, Varennes. The latter saves Cleonie from the guillotine by disguising her as his nephew and smuggling her out of France.

Cast

Critical reception
Writing for The Spectator in 1936, Graham Greene described the film as "incredibly silly and incredibly badly written but [with] a kind of wide-eyed innocence [...] which is almost endearing". Greene characterized the dialogue as "the worst I have heard these twelve months", and criticized the scenario and acting (which he attributed to the direction). Acknowledging the praise for this film from other reviewers Greene expressed concerns that other reviews may have been tainted by the presence of money.

TV Guide noted, "some racy bedroom scenes were clipped for the US release. The actors suffer from miscasting, but Asther gives an outstanding performance. Interesting use of camera angles stands out, as does the direction of the crowd scenes."

References

External links

1936 films
1930s historical drama films
British historical drama films
French Revolution films
Films directed by Karl Grune
Films based on British novels
Films set in the 18th century
Films shot at Imperial Studios, Elstree
British black-and-white films
1936 drama films
1930s English-language films
1930s British films